Sanglang may refer to:
Sanglang
Sanglang (state constituency), represented in the Perlis State Legislative Assembly